Riemann is a German surname. Notable people with this surname include the following:

 Bernhard Riemann (1826–1866), German mathematician, originator of Riemannian geometry
 Fritz Riemann (1859–1932), German chess master
 Fritz Riemann (psychologist) (1902–1979), German psychoanalyst
 Hugo Riemann (1849–1919), German musicologist
 Johannes Riemann (1888–1959), German actor
 Katja Riemann (born 1963), German actress
 Leopold Reimann (1892-1917), German flying ace
 Manuel Riemann (born 1988), German football (soccer) player
 Paula Riemann (born 1993), German actress
 Solomon Riemann (died c. 1873), Jewish traveller

See also 
 Reimann, a similar surname
 List of topics named after Bernhard Riemann
 Riemann (crater), a lunar crater

German-language surnames